In mathematics, Kingman's subadditive ergodic theorem is one of several ergodic theorems. It can be seen as a generalization of Birkhoff's ergodic theorem.
Intuitively, the subadditive ergodic theorem is a kind of random variable version of Fekete's lemma (hence the name ergodic). As a result, it can be rephrased in the language of probability, e.g. using a sequence of random variables and expected values.  The theorem is named after John Kingman.

Statement of theorem
Let  be a measure-preserving transformation on the probability space , and let  be a sequence of  functions such that  (subadditivity relation). Then

 

for -a.e. x, where g(x) is T-invariant. If T is ergodic, then g(x) is a constant.

Applications
Taking  recovers Birkhoff's pointwise ergodic theorem.

Kingman's subadditive ergodic theorem can be used to prove statements about Lyapunov exponents. It also has applications to percolations and probability/random variables.

References

External links

 Theorem proof (Steele)

Ergodic theory